Ch'orti' (or Chorti) may refer to:
Ch'orti' people - one of the indigenous Maya peoples of southeastern Guatemala and western Honduras
Ch’orti’ language - a Mayan language, spoken by the Ch'orti' people